New Zealand and South Seas Exhibitions may refer to:

New Zealand Exhibition (1865), Dunedin
New Zealand Industrial Exhibition (1885), Wellington
New Zealand and South Seas Exhibition (1889), Dunedin
International Exhibition (1906), Christchurch
New Zealand and South Seas International Exhibition (1925), Dunedin
New Zealand Centennial Exhibition (1939–1940), Wellington